Attempts to form a government in Spain followed the Spanish general election of 28 April 2019, which failed to deliver an overall majority for any political party. As a result, the previous cabinet headed by Pedro Sánchez was formed to remain in a caretaker capacity until the election of a new government.

Despite the April 2019 election delivering a clear plurality for left-of-centre parties, with the Spanish Socialist Workers' Party (PSOE) and Unidas Podemos being able to command a majority together with regionalist and nationalist parties, negotiations were frustrated as a result of conflicting positions between the two parties on the future government's composition. Both parties' opposite stances saw Pedro Sánchez trying and failing to pass an investiture vote on 23–25 July. Subsequently, a political impasse set in as King Felipe VI could not find a new candidate to nominate with sufficient parliamentary support. As a result, a snap election was held on 10 November.

The second election delivered a diminished plurality for PSOE and Unidas Podemos, which ended up accepting their shared responsibility and agreed on a joint government two days after the vote. A new investiture attempt on 5–7 January 2020 saw Sánchez re-elected as prime minister after  days without an operational government, which would see the formation of the first nationwide coalition cabinet in Spain since the Second Spanish Republic.

Legal provisions
The procedure for government formation in Spain was outlined in Article 99 of the 1978 Constitution:

First formation round (April–September 2019)

Post-April 2019 election developments

Election aftermath

While the April 2019 general election produced a hung parliament, the resulting parliamentary arithmetics coupled with the scale of the People's Party (PP) collapse ensured that incumbent Prime Minister Pedro Sánchez's Spanish Socialist Workers' Party (PSOE) was the only party that could realistically form a government. The outgoing government had been a PSOE minority cabinet with the external support of Unidas Podemos—the electoral alliance of Pablo Iglesias's Podemos, United Left (IU), En Comú Podem, Equo and other minor left-wing parties—as well as case-by-case support from the smaller regional and nationalist parties; after the election such a scheme could count with the 165 seats garnered by both PSOE and Unidas Podemos, but was hampered by the former's reluctance to reach any deal with Republican Left of Catalonia (ERC), which, together with Together for Catalonia (JxCat), had triggered the April 2019 election in the first place by siding with right-of-centre parties to reject Sánchez's 2019 General State Budget. Another possibility was an alliance between the PSOE and the liberal Citizens (Cs) party of Albert Rivera, together commanding an overall majority of 180 seats in the Congress of Deputies, but animosity among grassroot PSOE supporters to such deal (well represented by chants of "Not with Rivera!" during the party's victory celebrations), as well as Rivera's own pre-election veto to any sort of agreement with Sánchez, meant that such a scenario was unlikely.

Both Cs and PP leader Pablo Casado—who described his party's dismal performance as "very bad" but rejected to resign from his post—vyed for the leadership of the opposition to Sánchez's government, with far-right Vox having entered parliament for the first time. As a result of the election, the Spanish right was fragmented into three slices which, even taking regional allies such as Navarrese People's Union (UPN) into account, could only muster 149 seats, far from any prospective shot at forming a government. Rivera quickly rejected any chance of agreement with the PSOE, pointing out that "Sánchez and Iglesias are going to govern with the nationalists", despite attempts from both PSOE and PP to court the party into abstaining in order to allow the investiture process to proceed.

On 1 May, Sánchez arranged meetings with Casado, Rivera and Iglesias within the following days at Moncloa Palace in order to evaluate the post-election situation and probe their parties' stances towards his investiture, with the PSOE's aim being to renew their minority government and sustain it through stable parliamentary agreements with other parties, which would include Unidas Podemos and regionalists as well as peripheral nationalists. Iglesias, who claimed of having learned of such arrangements throughout the media, demanded as a prerequisite for supporting Sánchez's investiture that a coalition be formed between their two parties, calling for not taking for granted Unidas Podemos's support if such a condition was not met. Nonetheless, following the meetings on 6 and 7 May, and both Casado and Rivera confirming their negative stance to Sánchez's election, Iglesias came out positively that both him and Sánchez had "agreed to work in reaching an agreement". It was commented that Sánchez expected for a new government to be up and running by 20 June, but acknowledged that negotiations and the investiture vote itself would be delayed as a result of the ongoing campaign for the 26 May local, regional and European Parliament elections.

Initial approachments
The sympathetic attitude between PSOE and Unidas Podemos was first put to test in the negotiations for the Congress of Deputies Bureau on 21 May, which saw Territorial Policy minister Meritxell Batet becoming new president of the chamber as well as both parties securing a majority of the nine posts at stake, with the PSOE secured three and Unidas Podemos the remaining two.

Aside of PSOE and Unidas Podemos, various regionalist parties also supported Batet and other PSOE members to the Congress Bureau: the Basque Nationalist Party (PNV), Canarian Coalition (CCa), Commitment Coalition (Compromís) and the Regionalist Party of Cantabria (PRC), for a total of 175 supportive votes—one short of an overall majority—whereas ERC and EH Bildu cast invalid ballots including the word Llibertat (Catalan for "freedom") in protest for the jailing of several pro-Catalan independence leaders within the context of the judicial process investigating the events surrounding the failed 2017 referendum.

The 26 May elections saw the PSOE securing substantial wins and a number of territorial gains, whereas support for Unidas Podemos-supported candidacies plummeted. This prompted the PSOE to feel strengthened in the government formation negotiations and to ask Iglesias to reconsider his demands for a coalition, with Sánchez proposing a single-party cabinet that incorporated "renowned independents who may be well regarded by progressives", which could see the appointment of Unidas Podemos-proposed members beyond the coalition formula. While the incorporation of Podemos into the government had been generally seen as feasible after the 7 May Sánchez–Iglesias meeting, Iglesias acknowledged that his negotiating position had been weakened by his party's results in the local, regional and European Parliament elections, but insisted on his demand for entering the cabinet nonetheless. Concurrently, the PSOE attempted to pressure Cs into abstaining to ease Sánchez's election in an investiture vote, but this was met with a new rejection from Rivera's party.

Candidate Pedro Sánchez (PSOE): first attempt

June developments

Following the 26 May elections, King Felipe VI held a round of talks with the various parties with parliamentary representation in the Congress of Deputies which saw Pedro Sánchez being formally nominated as prime ministerial candidate on 6 June, which he accepted. Sánchez stressed that there was no alternative to his government and asked PP, Cs and Unidas Podemos for "high-mindedness" and "responsibility" to let him govern. By this point, conversations with other political parties had not seen any advance: CCa had already rejected supporting Sánchez if it meant either a coalition or a programmatic agreement with Podemos, UPN was willing to allow Sánchez's investiture only if he pressured his party's regional branch in Navarre to allow a UPN-led regional cabinet following the 2019 Navarrese election, whereas the position of pro-independence parties—namely, ERC, JxCat and EH Bildu—was dependant on Sánchez's stance towards their jailed leaders. An agreement was quickly reached with the Regionalist Party of Cantabria (PRC), which pledged its support to Sánchez's investiture in exchange for the PSOE renewing its support for Miguel Ángel Revilla as Cantabrian president following the 2019 regional election.

On 11 June, Sánchez met again with the leaders of PP, Cs and Unidas Podemos, this time in the building of the Congress of Deputies, in a move that signaled the formal start of negotiations  days after the general election. Both Sánchez and Iglesias emerged from the meeting agreeing to explore the formation of a "government of cooperation", a semantic point that was widely commented in the media because it explicitly excluded the use of the word "coalition", as well as because both leaders committed to such an "innovative" formula without resolving the main friction point between them, namely the entry of Unidas Podemos into the government or its right to appoint cabinet ministers. Soon, both parties clashed on the interpretation of this meeting's conclusions: for Unidas Podemos, what was agreed was to negotiate on the basis of a "plural" and "joint government" that did not exclude an eventual coalition; for the PSOE, it was a government that was "plural, open, inclusive and representative of various sensitivities", but that was to remain a Socialist-only executive with a number of independents that could be agreed with Podemos. PP leader Pablo Casado mocked the "cooperation government" term as "a new parliamentary and administrative kind." A new and discreet Sánchez–Iglesias summit on 17 June saw no advances or specific commitments, but rather "generic exchanges", an offer by the PSOE to award Unidas Podemos "intermediate posts" in the government structure outside the Council of Ministers—which was rejected by the latter—and the finding that the two parties' positions were "very far apart" because of the way in which each group understood the "cooperation".

On 24 June, in advance of a new meeting between Sánchez and Iglesias scheduled for the next day, it transcended that Sánchez had secretly met Casado at Moncloa earlier that day in an attempt to secure his party's abstention in his investiture, but this was met with Casado's negative; Rivera had also been invited to the meeting, amidst growing internal voices within Cs that called for at least considering to enter negotiations with the PSOE, but he refused to attend outright. In the wake of this event and following the meeting between their leaders—the fourth since the April 2019 election—Podemos accused Sánchez of having told Iglesias that he "preferred the right's support or going to a failed investiture without negotiating anything", a statement which was promptly denied by PSOE deputy secretary-general Adriana Lastra, who replied by accusing Iglesias of paving the ground for "voting against a left-wing prime minister"; both parties also hinted at each other's performance during the failed 2015–2016 government formation negotiations, which led to the June 2016 snap election. Finance minister María Jesús Montero warned Podemos that there would not be new opportunities should Sánchez's investiture—scheduled for July—failed, hinting at the possibility of a snap election being needed to unlock the situation, though this heavy-handed tone was brought down by the government the next day.

Rushed negotiations
On 3 July, Pablo Iglesias published a column in La Vanguardia newspaper in which he undertook to review his position for a coalition by September if Sánchez attempted—and failed—to get this proposal succeed in an investiture vote in July. The previous day, Sánchez had agreed with Congress speaker Meritxell Batet to schedule the start of the investiture plenary for 22 July, with successive votings on 23 July and, should a second round be needed, 25 July, despite not having secured the support of any other political group for his election. The next day, Sánchez offered Iglesias to designate a number of "renowned independents" to be appointed as ministers, and on 8 July the PSOE appointed a negotiating team to address programmatic contents with Unidas Podemos on the basis of a base document synthesizying the key elements of the Socialist electoral manifesto: employment and pensions; feminism and fight against social inequality; climate emergency and ecological transition; technological advance and digital transition; and Spain's position in Europe. The document left the issue of the Catalan crisis out of the paper, as it was one of the main friction programmatic points between the two parties.

On 9 July, a fifth meeting between Sánchez and Iglesias foundered, allegedly because Iglesias rejected making any sensible additions to the PSOE programmatic proposal and pressed for cabinet posts and the office of deputy prime minister for himself—according to PSOE sources—a claim which Unidas Podemos denied. On 11 July, Sánchez offered Unidas Podemos the right of appointing cabinet ministers on the condition that they had a more "technical profile", which was regarded by Iglesias as a "veto" to the main leaders of his alliance—including himself—and the proposal was rejected. The next day, Podemos announced that it would hold a vote among party members on 18 July, to decide what its stance should be on Sánchez's investiture under such circumstances, in which almost 70% of voters chose against a single-party PSOE government and in favour of a coalition with Podemos in order for the party to support the investiture.

Even before the Podemos vote was held, Sánchez dubbed it as a "masquerade" aimed at justifying opposing his investiture as well as a deliberate and one-sided break of negotiations, while accusing Iglesias of being entrenched in a "maximalist position"; he also stated that his offer for accepting Unidas Podemos members of technical profile into his government was to be considered as declined, and that in no case would he intend to improve on it. Further, he claimed that he would not "accept impositions" and vindicating for himself "the ability to decide who will join [his] government." On the next day, Iglesias replied to Sánchez by demanding his right to enter the cabinet, under the pretense that "Sánchez has never told me that I can't be there".

After several days of back-and-forth declarations, Sánchez revealed that the main obstacles in the negotiations were Iglesias's demands for a deputy prime ministership in control of the "social" areas of the government, the ministries of Finance, Labour and the Social Security as well as the responsibilities for government communication; demands that, ultimately, singled out Iglesias as the main impediment for a coalition between PSOE and Unidas Podemos. In response, on 19 July, Pablo Iglesias announced that he would renounce to become cabinet minister "as long as there are no more vetoes and the presence of Unidas Podemos in the government is proportional to its votes", while emphasizing that it was up to his party to choose the members that would be part of any coalition government. Sánchez and the PSOE replied by welcoming this predisposition, but stressed that negotiations should begin on the contents and the programmatic measures and that only then would the government composition be decided. Both PSOE and Unidas Podemos started negotiations against the clock, with only three days to go ahead of the start of Sánchez's investiture debate on 22 July.

First investiture attempt

Initially, negotiation talks went smoothly, with both parties being confident and optimistic on 21 July of an agreement being reached by the time of Sánchez's second investiture voting within four days, in which only a simple majority—that could be achieved with the support of Unidas Podemos, Compromís and the PRC and the abstention of ERC—would be needed for success. With promising advances on programmatic contents, the issue still remained on what Podemos's position in the cabinet would be, with the PSOE stressing its dominance of the so-called "state ministries" (Foreign Affairs, Justice, Defense and Interior) and disputes on the Finance, Labour, Social Security and Ecological Transition portfolios. Pedro Sánchez's investiture debate was scheduled to start at 12:00 CEST (UTC+2) on 22 July with Sánchez's speech, to be followed by the replies of all other parties and a first round of voting on 23 July, with a second and final balloting on 25 July if required.

Second formation round (November 2019 – January 2020)

Candidate Pedro Sánchez (PSOE): second attempt

Post-November 2019 election developments
Immediately after the election, the PSOE ruled out a grand coalition with the PP as a way to end the deadlock. On 12 November, PSOE and Podemos announced a pre-agreement for a full four-year coalition government; such an agreement, if securing the parliamentary support from regional and nationalist parties, would see the first coalition government since the Second Spanish Republic.

On 23 November the PSOE and the PSC held membership votes on the pre-agreement with Unidas Podemos; this was approved by 94.7% and 93.3% of the participants.

On 27 November, Podemos held a membership vote on the pre-agreement with the Socialist party, which was approved by 96.8% of the participants. United Left held a similar membership vote between 22 and November in which 88% of the participants approved the pre-agreement.

Second investiture attempt

References

Government formation
Government formation
Spanish
Government of Spain